Nora Sourouzian is a French-Canadian mezzo-soprano with Armenian roots.

Early life and education

Born in Montreal, Quebec, she studied piano and voice at McGill University with Thérèse Sevadjian. During her time at McGill University she already sang Mrs Herring in Albert Herring, the title roles in Giulio Cesare and Mignon, the Komponist in Ariadne auf Naxos, as well as Hänsel in Hänsel und Gretel with the Orchestre Métropolitain de Montréal.

From 1998 to 1999 she was a member of the Internationaal Opera Centrum Nederland in Amsterdam, where she sang Lucrezia in The Rape of Lucretia.

Artistic career 
From 1999 to 2001, Sourouzian was part of the soloist ensemble of Staatstheater Kassel.

Since 2002 Sourouzian is a freelance opera singer. Her career, which leads her all over Europe, parts of USA, Canada, Chile, Asia and Mexico, consists of numerous leading roles both of well-known and rare repertoire. One of her key roles throughout many years has been Carmen which she interpreted in many opera houses such as Welsh National Opera (2004), Klagenfurt,  (2005), Opéra de Québec, Den Norske Opera (2006), the Teatro Comunale Ponchielli in Cremona] (2008), Opéra de Lausanne and Tokyo (2008–2009), Oper Köln (2009), Leipzig and Bologna, Teatro Lirico di Cagliari (2010), Minnesota (2015). and Palm Beach Opera (2016); She recently appeared in Santiago de Chile with Mahler's Symphony No. 3 and sang Marguerite in La damnation de Faust at the Palacio de Bellas Artes Mexico.

Sourouzian sang leading roles such as: Idamante (Mozart, Idomeneo), Dorabella (Mozart, Così fan tutte), Romeo (Bellini, I Capuleti e i Montecchi), Marguerite (Berlioz, La damnation de Faust), Dulcinée (Massenet's Don Quichotte, production of Laurent Pelly in Palermo), Laura (A. Ponchielli, La Gioconda) and La Favorita (Donizetti, La favorite), Eboli (Verdi, Don Carlo) and Azucena] (Verdi, Il trovatore). Her role debut and strong interpretation of the role at Graz Opera in 2017 was highly acclaimed in the press.,,. In January 2019 she appeared at Seattle Opera also in the role of Azucena.

Alongside well-known repertoire, Sourouzian regularly sings opera roles of rare pieces. She sang Aloès in David Pountney's production of Chabrier's L'étoile under John Eliot Gardiner at Zürich Opera House in 2006, Maria Callas in Michael Daugherty's opera Jackie O in a production of Damiano Michieletto, which is available on DVD. Her interpretation of Thérèse (Massenet, Thérèse) and Anita (Massenet, La Navarraise) at the Wexford Festival 2013 was highly praised in the international press.

Sourouzian collaborates with directors such as Calixto Bieito (Così fan tutte), Robert Carsen (Carmen), Moshe Leiser and Patrice Caurier (Carmen), Christine Mielitz (Così fan tutte), Christof Loy (Carmen), David Pountney (L’Étoile), Barbe & Doucet (Pénélope, Thérèse and La Navarraise) and Vera Nemirova (Rusalka at Theater St. Gallen 2019).

She has so far sung under the baton of conductors like Christoph Eschenbach, Marc Minkowski, Ed Spanjaard, Franz Welser-Möst, Hubert Soudant, Dietfried Bernet, Cyril Diederich, Joseph Rescigno and Nicholas McGegan.

Competitions 
 First prize at Prix d'Expression Musicale – 1995
 Winner at Fondation Charles Emiles Gadbois
 First prize at Concours de la Journée de la Musique Française – Montréal 1997
 Second prize at Début-CBC – USA 1997
 First prize at NATS International – 1997
 First prize in all categories at Concours de Musique du Canada 1997
 First prize at Jeunes Ambassadeurs Lyriques 1999
 Finalist at Hans Gabor Belvedere – Vienna 1999
 Finalist at the 3rd Wagnerstimmen Wettbewerb Saarbrücken in 2000

Recordings 
Jackie O, Michael Daugherty
Salome, R. Strauss
Atma Classic Gala 30th Anniversaire Montreal

References

External links 
 

Canadian mezzo-sopranos
Operatic mezzo-sopranos
Year of birth missing (living people)
Living people
Canadian people of Armenian descent
McGill University School of Music alumni
20th-century Canadian women singers
21st-century Canadian women singers
Singers from Montreal